The 2016 Engie Open de Cagnes-sur-Mer Alpes-Maritimes was a professional tennis tournament played on outdoor clay courts. It was the nineteenth edition of the tournament and part of the 2016 ITF Women's Circuit, offering a total of $100,000 in prize money. It took place in Cagnes-sur-Mer, France, on 2–8 May 2016.

Singles main draw entrants

Seeds 

 1 Rankings as of 25 April 2016.

Other entrants 
The following players received wildcards into the singles main draw:
  Manon Arcangioli
  Irina Ramialison
  Fiona Ferro

The following players received entry from the qualifying draw:
  Karen Barritza
  Ekaterine Gorgodze
  Karolína Muchová
  Olga Sáez Larra

The following players received entry by a lucky loser spot:
  Beatriz Haddad Maia
  Tamara Korpatsch
  Anaïs van Cauter

Champions

Singles

 Magda Linette def.  Carina Witthöft, 6–3, 7–5

Doubles

 Andreea Mitu /  Demi Schuurs def.  Xenia Knoll /  Aleksandra Krunić, 6–4, 7–5

External links 
 2016 Engie Open de Cagnes-sur-Mer Alpes-Maritimes at ITFtennis.com
 Official website 

2016 ITF Women's Circuit
2016 in French tennis
Open de Cagnes-sur-Mer
May 2016 sports events in France